The 1994 Ohio State Buckeyes football team represented the Ohio State University in the 1994 NCAA Division I-A football season. The Buckeyes compiled a 9–4 record, including the 1995 Florida Citrus Bowl in Orlando, Florida, where they lost, 24–17, to the Alabama Crimson Tide, a team one point away from playing in the national championship game.

Schedule

Roster

Rankings

Game summaries

Fresno State

Washington

Pitt

Houston

Northwestern

Illinois

Michigan State

Purdue

Penn State

Wisconsin

Indiana

Michigan

vs. Alabama (Citrus Bowl)

Coaching staff
 John Cooper – Head Coach – 7th year
 Bill Conley – Recruiting Coordinator (8th year)
 Larry Coker – Defensive Backs (2nd year)
 Joe Hollis – Offensive Coordinator (4th year)
 Ron Hudson – Quarterbacks (7th year)
 Lee Owens –  (3rd year)
 Fred Pagac – Defensive Linebackers (13th year)
 Tim Spencer – Running Backs (1st year)
 Mike Stock – Offensive Wide Receivers (3rd year)
 Bill Young – Defensive Coordinator (7th year)

1995 NFL draftees

Awards and honors
Orlando Pace, Big Ten Freshman of the Year

References

Ohio State
Ohio State Buckeyes football seasons
Ohio State Buckeyes football